Harry Forbes (May 13, 1879 – December 19, 1946) was an American boxer who took the World Bantamweight Title on November 11, 1901, when he defeated Danny Dougherty in a second-round knockout in Saint Louis, Missouri.  He lost the title three years later, on August 13, 1903, to Frankie Neil in a second-round knockout at the Mechanics Pavilion in San Francisco, California.

He was a prolific boxer who boxed 146 verified matches and faced such exceptional boxers as bantamweight champions Johnny Coulon, and Johnny Reagan, as well as meeting the exceptional featherweight champion Abe Attell six times in matches that gained national interest.  He also faced accomplished boxers Benny Yanger, Tommy O'Toole, Terry McGovern, Kid Goodman, and Joe Cherry.

Early career
Harry Forbes was born in Rockford, Illinois on May 12, 1879.  He began his boxing career around the age of eighteen in Chicago by winning eleven of thirteen of his better publicized fights that year with three by knockout, though his knockout percentage would increase in later years.  He was an early boxing pupil of Harry Gilmore of Chicago, who also taught Tommy White and Eddie Santry.

First attempt at the World bantam title

His important youthful bout with Terry McGovern, on December 22, 1899, was billed as a World bantamweight title match. McGovern was considered by many boxing historians as one of the greatest featherweights and one of the hardest hitters of all time.  Forbes was only 22, though he already had over fifty fights to his name. He lost the Bantamweight Title shot, receiving a second-round TKO at Broadway Athletic Club in New York, with a total fighting time of only 1 minute 33 seconds into the second round.  Of his October 1, 1898 non-title bout with "Terrible Terry" McGovern, one newspaper wrote, "He gave the 'Brooklyn Terror' a hard tussle for fifteen rounds before McGovern landed his soporific punch," knocking out Forbes at the Pelican A. C. in New York.

On March 17, 1900, he lost to the exceptional boxer Benny Yanger, in a fifth-round TKO in Chicago, Illinois. Yanger was one of the few boxers to ever defeat Abe Attell.

World bantam champion
When he clinched the Bantamweight title with his win over Danny Dougherty on November 11, 1901, in St. Louis, surprisingly little coverage was featured in most national newspapers, possibly because Dougherty was not as well-known a boxer.  The Scranton Republican wrote simply that Forbes had administered a "second round knockout defeat to Danny Dougherty of Philadelphia in what was to be a fifteen round battle." Greater interest would have been generated by defeating a reigning champion who had held the title for a significant period. In his rematch with Dougherty on June 22, 1903, Forbes won in a six-round newspaper decision in Philadelphia in a non-title fight.

Defending World bantam title
His February 27, 1902 bout with Tommy Felz, which he won, was billed as a World bantamweight championship, but his fifteen-round May 1, 1902 World Bantamweight Title match with Johnny Reagan gained greater interest, considering Reagan's stature in the boxing community.  The bout was declared a draw, and though one newspaper wrote that in the event of a draw an additional five bouts would be fought, this did not occur.

In May and June 1902, he fought Johnny Reagan, and Young Devaney in World bantamweight title matches, successfully retaining his title.

He had three more important defenses of the title with Andrew Tokell, Johnny Kelly, and Frankie Neil between December 1902, and March 1903, winning two impressively by knockout or technical knockout.

World Bantam Title loss

On August 13, 1903, Forbes lost the World bantamweight title in a second-round knockout against Frankie Neil at the Mechanics Pavilion in San Francisco, a familiar venue for important San Francisco boxing. According to the St. Paul Globe, the winning blow was a hard left to the stomach of Forbes.  Forbes had been a two to one betting favorite prior to the bout due to his standing as reigning champion, though many boxing fans still backed Neil to win. In the brief two rounds of boxing, Forbes had been down three times, probably surprising many in the audience.

On September 18, 1903, Forbes bested Tommy Love in his hometown Philadelphia, in a six-round bout. He did not outpoint his opponent until the last of six rounds, but had the advantage so decisively in that round by his furious punching that knocked Love to the mat, that he won the bout in the decision of most newspapers.  Forbes showed his determination and stamina as a young boxer in the bout, though his inability to move decisively against his opponent in the early rounds may have indicated a lack of focus after his loss of the bantamweight title.

Feather title attempt
On February 1, 1904, Forbes met Abe Attell in a World featherweight title Match, in St Louis at the West End Athletic Club. In his typically dominant style, Attell knocked out Forbes in the fifth of a twenty-round match.  They had met previously on January 4, 1904 in another title fight which resulted in a ten-round draw in Indianapolis, Indiana. In reference to Forbes' impressive November 4, 1901, fifteen round points decision over Attell in St. Louis, Louisville's Courier-Journal wrote, "Forbes is the only fighter who Attell acknowledges to have ever gained a legitimate decision over him."  It was the only victory Forbes would have over Attell, and increased interest in their five additional bouts.  The Journal noted that "even money" was bet on their February 1904 meeting, a remarkable achievement for Forbes considering Attell's dominance and reputation, and that the fight would be "one of the best betting propositions offered in this part of the country in some time."

For one of their last meetings, the Detroit Free Press noted that "both boys are past masters in the art of hit and get away," emphasizing that both had skills in evading blows after delivering one, though most historians would consider Attell the far superior tactician.   Their first three bouts were a loss in November 1901 and two draws in November 1902, and January 1904.  In February 1904, Attell won with a fifth-round TKO, while in their meeting in February 1910, Attell TKO'd Forbes in the seventh round in Troy, New York.  Only their January and February meetings in 1904 were Featherweight Title matches, and Attell probably consented to them knowing he had the edge as Forbes had already forfeited his World Bantamweight Title.

In November 1904 and January 1905, Forbes knocked out Joe Cherry twice in bouts in Michigan.  Of their November 25, 1904 bout in Saginaw, the St. Louis Post-Dispatch wrote that "The fighting was fierce at all times and the honors were even up until the sixth round when Forbes scored the first knockdown." After the sixth, Forbes had the upper hand, having little fear of Cherry's blows, until he knocked out Cherry in the thirteenth round.

Forbes attempted to retire in 1907, and did not fight again until 1910. One source rates his 1911 bout with the well known Johnny Coulon as the beginning of the final stage of his career.

Swindling arrest
Forbes was arrested on suspicion of swindling and fraudulent use of the mails in 1909. He was sentenced to two years in prison and waged a fine of $10,000 on March 20, 1910.  The John C. Mabry gang, of which he had become a part, obtained funds fraudulently on the promise they could fix athletic events in the sports of boxing, wrestling, foot, and horse racing.  The gang was reputed to have fraudulently obtained as much as five million dollars in two years.  Eighty four men were indicted and fourteen convicted in the scheme that stretched across the territory of many states.

On August 22, 1911, President Taft commuted the two-year sentence against Forbes for swindling and reduced his fine. More surprisingly he appointed him a Deputy Sheriff.  The reason given for commuting his sentence was the good behavior he exhibited during his prison term and his aid in convicting thirteen other defendants who were convicted with him.

Resuming boxing
After serving time for swindling, Forbes fought at least twenty fights between 1910, and 1922, when he retired from boxing.  He resumed his boxing career on February 28, 1911, against George Ramsey in Troy, New York, winning in a second-round knockout.

One of his last shots at fame was his no decision World Bantamweight Title match with Johnny Coulon on March 28, 1911, in an ice rink in Winosha, Wisconsin.  Most newspapers considered Forbes the loser of the bout.  The Trenton Evening Times wrote that they considered the boxers he fought after this last meeting with Coulon strictly "second rate."  After November 1911, Forbes lost six of seven of his better publicized bouts including a rematch with ex-Bantamweight Champion Johnny Coulon on January 22, 1912 in Winosha, Wisconsin.

Later years
Forbes died at Illinois Masonic Hospital on December 19, 1946.  He was sixty-seven years old.

Professional boxing record
All information in this section is derived from BoxRec, unless otherwise stated.

Official record

All newspaper decisions are officially regarded as “no decision” bouts and are not counted in the win/loss/draw column.

Unofficial record

Record with the inclusion of newspaper decisions in the win/loss/draw column.

See also
List of bantamweight boxing champions

References

External links
 
 Harry Forbes - CBZ Profile

|-

|-

World bantamweight boxing champions
1879 births
American male boxers
1946 deaths
Bantamweight boxers
Boxers from Chicago